Abdulsalam Kajman is a Libyan politician who has served on the Presidential Council of Libya since 2016. He is one of the original five Vice Presidents of the Council and is part of the Justice and Construction Party, a Muslim Brotherhood affiliate in Libya.

References

20th-century births
Living people
Government ministers of Libya
Justice and Construction Party politicians
Members of the Presidential Council (Libya)
Year of birth missing (living people)